The Treasons Act 1534 (26 Hen. 8. c. 13) was an Act of the Parliament of England passed in 1534, during the reign of King Henry VIII.

Background
This Act was passed after the Act of Supremacy 1534, which made the king the "Only Head of the Church of England on Earth so far as the Law of God allows."

The Act 
The Act made it treason, punishable by death, to disavow the Act of Supremacy 1534. Sir Thomas More was executed under this Act. It was introduced as a blanket law in order to deal with the minority of cases who would refuse to accept Cromwell's and Henry's changes in policies, instead of using the more traditional method of attainders.

The Act specified that all those were guilty of high treason who:

The word 'maliciously' was added in several cases to require evil intent, and the Act meant that it was very dangerous to say anything against what the King had done. The Act also made it treason to rebelliously keep or withhold from the King his castles, forts, ships, or artillery, and to fail to surrender any of them within six days of being commanded to do so. It also abolished sanctuary for those accused of high treason.

The Treasons Act 1534 was repealed by the Treason Act 1547.

See also
Treason Act 1551
High treason in the United Kingdom

1534 in law
1534 in England
Acts of the Parliament of England (1485–1603)
Treason in England